Hans Henrik Stoermann-Næss (3 November 1886 – 10 December 1958) was a Norwegian sailor who competed in the 1920 Summer Olympics. He was born and died in Bergen. Næss was a crew member of the Norwegian boat Atlanta, which won the gold medal in the 12 metre class (1907 rating).

References

External links 

1886 births
1958 deaths
Norwegian male sailors (sport)
Sailors at the 1920 Summer Olympics – 12 Metre
Olympic sailors of Norway
Olympic gold medalists for Norway
Olympic medalists in sailing
Medalists at the 1920 Summer Olympics
Sportspeople from Bergen